For information about the British Marxist newspaper named Socialist Challenge see International Marxist Group.

Socialist Challenge was a Trotskyist group in English Canada formed by former members of the Revolutionary Workers League/Ligue Ouvrière Révolutionnaire who were expelled or resigned when the RWL moved away from Trotskyism in the early 1980s.

Origins
In 1977, supporters of the Revolutionary Marxist Group and a separate Quebec organization, the Groupe Marxiste Revolutionnaire, united with the League for Socialist Action and the Ligue Socialiste Ouvrière to form the Revolutionary Workers League/Ligue Ouvrière Révolutionnaire which became the new Canadian section of the reunified Fourth International.  

The RWL was closely linked to the Socialist Workers Party in the United States. As the SWP moved away from traditional Trotskyist ideas in the early 1980s its supporters in the RWL followed suit (see Pathfinder Tendency) and those who resisted the change were either expelled from the RWL or resigned.

Creation of Socialist Challenge
A number of ex-RWL members formed a number of groups under various names in cities across Canada such as the "Socialist Workers Committee" in Toronto. They regrouped in 1986 as the "Alliance for Socialist Action" and, in 1988 adopted the name Socialist Challenge (after the name of their newspaper) as a result of an organizational fusion with the Quebec group Gauche Socialiste (the formal name of the group was Socialist Challenge/Gauche Socialiste). 
 
Socialist Challenge was initially a sympathizing section of the reunified Fourth International but became the FI's official section in English Canada in the late 1980s after the RWL, now called the Communist League, left the FI.

1994 split and aftermath
Socialist Challenge underwent a severe split in 1994 when Barry Weisleder, the editor of the newspaper, was expelled. Weisleder and his supporters formed Socialist Action.

Socialist Challenge joined the New Socialist Group soon after the NSG's founding in 1996. Socialist Challenge became a tendency within the NSG and the newspaper Socialist Challenge ceased publication in favour of the NSG's New Socialist. In 1999, Socialist Challenge formally dissolved as an independent group and became the Fourth International Caucus of the NSG. The caucus remained the official English Canadian section of the USFI. The New Socialist Group dissolved in 2017 though local groups remain active.

Gauche Socialiste still exists as an autonomous section of the Fourth International, and has "fraternal relations" with the NSG.

References

Trotskyist organizations in Canada
Fourth International (post-reunification)